Sandra Regol (born 13 April 1978) is a French politician from EELV. She became the Member of Parliament for Bas-Rhin's 1st constituency in the 2022 French legislative election.

References

See also 

 List of deputies of the 16th National Assembly of France

Living people
1978 births
People from Béziers
Deputies of the 16th National Assembly of the French Fifth Republic
21st-century French women politicians
21st-century French politicians
Europe Ecology – The Greens politicians
Women members of the National Assembly (France)
Members of Parliament for Bas-Rhin